The Men's 50 metre rifle three positions event at the 2008 Olympic Games took place on August 17 at the Beijing Shooting Range Hall, the last shooting event of the Beijing Olympics.

The event consisted of two rounds: a qualifier and a final. In the qualifier, each shooter fired 120 shots with a .22 Long Rifle at 50 metres distance. 40 shots were fired each from the standing, kneeling, and prone positions. Scores for each shot were in increments of 1, with a maximum score of 10.

The top 8 shooters in the qualifying round moved on to the final round. There, they fired an additional 10 shots, all from the standing position. These shots scored in increments of .1, with a maximum score of 10.9. The total score from all 130 shots was used to determine the final ranking.

Records
The existing world and Olympic records were as follows.

Qualification round

Prone position

Standing position

Kneeling position

Combined results

DNS Did not start – Q Qualified for final

Final

Shooting at the 2008 Summer Olympics
Men's 050m 3 positions 2008
Men's events at the 2008 Summer Olympics